The Mattock River is a river in Ireland. It is a tributary of the River Boyne. 

Its source is near Collon, from where it flows through County Louth towards the southeast until a place west of Drummond Tower in Coolfore where it begins to form the boundary between Counties Meath and Louth. Here it turns towards the southwest until Monknewtown where it takes a southeastern direction again before turning roughly east at Dowth. It joins the River Boyne at Oldbridge in the parish of Drogheda.

Rivers of County Louth
Rivers of County Meath